Hans Vonk (born August 15, 1959, in Arnhem) is a Dutch male track cyclist and road cyclist. He was professional between 1981 and 1982. He became one time Dutch Track Cycling Champion in the 1 km time trial and competed at the 1981 UCI Track Cycling World Championships.

Career

Track cycling
At the Dutch National Track Championships he became national champion in the 1 km time trial in 1980 after winning the two bronze medals in 1978 and 1979. He further won a silver medal in the tandem discipline in 1978 and a bronze medal in the pursuit for amateur riders in 1980. Vonk was selected to compete in the points race event at the 1981 UCI Track Cycling World Championships.

Road cycling
As an amateur cyclist he won competed in local cycle races in the late 1970s and won the Tour of South-East Friesland. In 1980 he won the sixth stage of the Tour of Slovakia. He became professional in 1981 and joined the Dutch team HB Alarmsystemen and the year afterwards the Dutch team AMKO Sport. As of 2011 he is still taking part in cycling races.

See also
 Netherlands at the 1981 UCI Track Cycling World Championships

References

External links
 Profile at cyclingarchives.com

1959 births
Living people
Dutch male cyclists
Sportspeople from Arnhem
Dutch cyclists at the UCI Track Cycling World Championships
Cyclists from Gelderland